Gulskogen Manor is a manor house and landscape park which forms part of Drammen Museum  in Drammen in Viken county, Norway.  The manor house is filled with historic furnishings and reproduction works of art.

Background
Drammen's richest merchant, Peter Nicolai Arbo and his wife Anne Cathrine Collett acquired the manor at auction in 1794. They gradually expanded the property into a modern country house estate. The main house and wings resemble European stone architecture. At the beginning of the 1800s, rows of magnificent landed properties within the  vicinity stretched like two belts along both sides of the Drammen River.

Main house
The manor house at Gulskogen was erected in the Louis XVI style in 1804. The house contains the original furnishings that belonged to several generations of the Arbo family. In the many beautiful rooms of Gulskogen Manor are works by the distinguished history-painter Peter Nicolai Arbo. He spent his childhood here and there are several paintings made by Arbo in the main building.

Model farm 
Gulskogen Manor comprises a main house and an outbuilding with a courtyard and park grounds. Estates like these were run as model farms in the old days, and new farming technology was quickly adopted. The present barn is from 1887 and now holds some of the tools that were used during this period. The side wing that houses the tool house and wagon shed is the original building, but is hidden under new paneling.

Estate gardens 
The garden was laid out in the style of an English landscaped park, and was officially opened with a huge garden party in 1804. The garden has always been the estate's main attraction, and stands today as one of Norway's best preserved gardens from that period. The garden is divided into three terraces that are connected by stairs. The prominent terraces are separated from each other by straight-lined avenues and other seemingly random areas.

From the mid-19th century, the garden evolved a more overgrown, romantic style, as was the trend at that time. It was during this period that the ponds in the north garden were added. Since 1972, the garden has been maintained in such a way as to accentuate more of its original character.

References

External links
Drammen Museum website

Houses completed in 1804
Art museums and galleries in Norway
Museums in Viken
Museums with year of establishment missing 
Manor houses in Norway
Gardens in Norway
Farms in Viken
Local museums in Norway
Parks in Norway
Historic farms in Norway
Buildings and structures in Drammen
Historic house museums in Norway